The Department of Canadian Heritage lays out protocol guidelines for the display of flags, including an order of precedence; these instructions are only conventional, however, and are generally intended to show respect for what are considered important symbols of the state or institutions. The sovereign's personal standard is supreme in the order of precedence, followed by those for the monarch's representatives (depending on jurisdiction), the personal flags of other members of the Royal Family, and then the national flag and provincial flags.

Many museums across Canada display historic flags in their exhibits. The Canadian Museum of History, in Hull, Quebec has many culturally important flags in their collections. Settlers, Rails & Trails Inc., in Argyle, Manitoba holds the second largest exhibit - known as the Canadian Flag Collection.

State

National

Ceremonial

Provincial

Territorial

Royal

Viceregal and administrative

Governor general

Lieutenant governors and commissioners

Supreme Court of Canada

Canadian Armed Forces

Canadian Army

Royal Canadian Navy

Royal Canadian Air Force

Canada Border Services Agency

Coast Guard

Police

Canadian Cadets, Junior Canadian Rangers, and cadet leagues

Civil

Corporations

Crown corporations

Hudson's Bay Company

Religious

Ethnic groups

Indigenous nations

Blackfoot

Cree

Inuit

Francophone peoples

Immigrants

Municipal

Historical

National

Civil ensigns

Newfoundland

Rebellions

Viceregal

Coronation standards

Other

Proposed

Regional

Official

Unofficial

House flags of Canadian freight companies

Yacht clubs of Canada

See also

 Canadian Heraldic Authority
 Canadian heraldry
 Canadian royal symbols
 Great Canadian Flag Debate
 List of Canadian provincial and territorial symbols
 National symbols of Canada

References

External links

 World Flag Database
 Canadian Government Homepage- The National Flag of Canada
 Flags used in 1837-39 in Lower Canada
 Settlers, Rails & Trails (museum) Canadian Flag Collection

Canada
 
Flags